Truth or Consequences Municipal Airport  is a public-use airport located six miles (10 km) north of Truth or Consequences, a town in Sierra County, New Mexico, United States. This general aviation airport is publicly owned by the city of Truth or Consequences. It has five runways, one of which is paved. The paved runway (13/31) is used for most flights.

History
The airport last saw scheduled airline service in the early 1950s when Continental Airlines landed its DC-3s  as one of several stops made along their original route from Denver to El Paso. Zia Airlines flights from Albuquerque to Las Cruces in the mid-1970s would stop at the airport upon request.

References

External links 

Airports in New Mexico
Transportation in Sierra County, New Mexico
Buildings and structures in Sierra County, New Mexico